The Lukas Enembe Stadium, formerly known as Papua Bangkit Stadium (Rising Papua Stadium), is a multi-purpose stadium located within the Lukas Enembe Sports Complex in Jayapura Regency, Papua, Indonesia. Located between the Cyclops Mountains and Lake Sentani, the stadium takes up 71,697 square meters of land and can accommodate more than 40,263 spectators. Named after current governor of Papua Lukas Enembe, it was built as the main venue for the 2021 Pekan Olahraga Nasional.

Construction began in late of 2016 and completed in May 2019. The structure of the stadium came from the special autonomy fund and the national budget for the Papua provincial budget, which in total spent around IDR 1.3 trillion.

References

Buildings and structures in Papua (province)
Multi-purpose stadiums in Indonesia
Sports venues in Papua (province)
Football venues in Papua (province)
Athletics (track and field) venues in Papua (province)
Sports venues completed in 2019
2019 establishments in Indonesia